Wentloog (also known as Wentlloog and Wentllooge) was an ancient hundred of Monmouthshire. It was also known as Newport hundred.

It was situated in the western part of the county, bounded to the north by Brecknockshire; on the east by the hundreds of Abergavenny, Usk and Caldicot; on the south by the Bristol Channel, and on the west by Glamorganshire. Wentloog is an anglicisation of the Welsh Gwynllŵg, the name of the early kingdom and medieval cantref.

It contained the following ancient parishes:

Aberystruth
Bassaleg: consisting of Duffryn township, Graig hamlet and Rogerstone township
Bedwas
Bedwellty
Bettws
Coedkernew
Henllys
Llanfihangel Llantarnam
Llanhilleth
Machen
Malpas
Marshfield
Michaelston y vedw
Mynyddislwyn
Newport
Peterstone Wentlooge
Risca
Rumney
St. Brides Wentlooge
St. Mellons
St. Woolos

The area is now administered by several local authorities, in particular Newport, Torfaen, Blaenau Gwent and Caerphilly.

See also
Wentlooge community (parish)
Gwynllwg

References

External links
Wentloog Hundred on a Vision of Britain